M.L.R.T. Gala Pioneer English School is a high school located in Mumbai, India. It is one of the fastest growing schools in Mumbai's Kandivali suburb. The principal is Mrs. Rekha Rohira right from the foundation of the school.

History
Pioneer Education Trust took a decision to start an English medium school with 6 students in the year June 1988. The School was named as M.L.R.T. Gala Pioneer English School

The Primary Section began in the year 1990 and Secondary Section was introduced in the year 1994. Today number of students are 929 in June 2011.

Facilities
The School is a building with five floors and a terrace. It includes two massive auditorium halls. There is an AV room, two laboratories and a computer lab in the school.

Syllabus
The syllabus is based on the SSC board pattern. There are unit and terminal examinations.

International projects
The school has also been involved in prestigious international projects like :

Gardens for Life project (GFL)

United Kingdom India Education Research Initiative(UKIERI)

International Climate Challenge Project

Under DFID Global School Partnership Programme.

References

High schools and secondary schools in Mumbai